The Yolo Bypass is one of the two flood bypasses in California's Sacramento Valley located in Yolo and Solano Counties. Through a system of weirs, the bypass diverts floodwaters from the Sacramento River away from the state's capital city of Sacramento and other nearby riverside communities.

During wet years, the bypass can be full of water. The main input to the bypass is through the passive Fremont Weir, where water spills from the Sacramento into the bypass if it reaches the  crest. Downstream, the Sacramento Weir, just north of the city of West Sacramento, can also be opened to divert additional waters from the Sacramento if needed. From the west, Cache Creek drains into the bypass. The bypass itself runs south, parallel to the Sacramento, and drains into the Sacramento-San Joaquin Delta, a few kilometres north of Rio Vista.

The bypass is crossed by the Yolo Causeway, a long highway bridge on Interstate 80, linking West Sacramento and the city of Davis, as well as by a rail causeway just north of the Yolo Causeway used by freight and Amtrak trains. To the north, Interstate 5 also crosses the bypass on the Elkhorn Causeway, east of the city of Woodland.

History
Sacramento experienced several severe floods prior to construction of the bypass. The Yolo Basin, a depression formed during the last ice age, would fill up with water during the winter months from seasonal rainfall and runoff into the three rivers surrounding what is now the city of Sacramento (Sacramento, San Joaquin, and American). This created a diverse marsh ecosystem that could last more than 100 days. During the 1800s, seasonal flooding would limit travel and access between cities in the Sacramento River valley.

Congress approved the Sacramento River Flood Control Project in 1911, with a plan to divert the water through multiple weirs and bypasses. The Yolo Bypass is one of two major bypasses in the Sacramento Valley that helps deter urban flooding. The other bypass is the Sutter Bypass, which lies upstream of the Yolo Bypass. The  Yolo Bypass floodplain was designed in the early 1930s by the US Army Corps of Engineers. 

The two largest sources for the Yolo Bypass are the Sacramento Weir, completed in 1916, and the Fremont Weir, completed in 1929.

Uses
Almost 75% of the Yolo Bypass is privately owned, while the rest belongs to the Yolo Bypass Wildlife Area. Most of the land is used for agriculture during the summer and spring, and the rest makes up marshland. This marshland is ideal for animal habitat, and is also utilized for fishing, hunting, and other recreational activities.

Flood control

Flood control is the main purpose of the Yolo Bypass. When the water reaches the  mark it starts to flow out into the Yolo Basin.

North of where the Elkhorn Causeway crosses the Yolo Bypass, the Cache Creek flood control basin drains into the Yolo Bypass. The Knights Landing Ridge Cut, where the Colusa Basin Drainage Canal empties, also contributes to the flow in the Yolo Bypass near this point.

There is a second weir just north of West Sacramento, the Sacramento Weir, upstream of the confluence of the Sacramento and American Rivers. The Sacramento Weir is opened manually when the Sacramento River reaches  at the I Street Bridge.

Water flowing through the Yolo Bypass is drained through a riparian channel along its southeastern edge, named the Toe Drain. In the Liberty Farms area, the bypass joins first Prospect Slough and then Cache Slough adjacent to the connection of the Sacramento Deep Water Ship Channel. Cache Slough then reconnects with the Sacramento River just north of Rio Vista. The water eventually flows into the Sacramento-San Joaquin Delta, just above Rio Vista, and from there into San Francisco Bay.

The Yolo Bypass can hold approximately four times the flow of the Sacramento River. This flood management relieves pressure on the surrounding river levee systems and reduces the risk of urban flooding in nearby cities, such as Sacramento or Davis.

The state of California has the right to inundate any land in the Yolo Bypass with floodwater. These rights also limit landowners from growing vegetation or building structures that would significantly obstruct flow. There is no compensation for farmers who may lose crops or other losses due to flooding. The state manages the flooding of the Yolo Bypass with farmers and native species in mind. Using adaptive management, there is a balance between providing efficient flood protection, agriculture, and habitat benefits in the Yolo Bypass year-round.

Wildlife habitats
The Yolo Bypass contains the Fremont Weir Wildlife Area, Sacramento Weir Wildlife Area and Yolo Bypass Wildlife Area. The Vic Fazio Yolo Wildlife Area is also part of the Yolo Bypass Wildlife Area and was the largest public/private restoration project west of the Florida Everglades. The entire bypass forms a valuable wetland habitat when flooded during the winter and spring rainy season. In the summer, areas of the bypass outside the wildlife areas are used for agriculture.

The Yolo Bypass provides habitat for over 280 terrestrial vertebrate species, changing throughout the seasons. The natural flooding provides an exceptionally good nursery habitat for native fish species, including the endangered Chinook salmon. Juvenile salmon have been found to grow substantially better in the Yolo Bypass than the adjacent Sacramento River. Other special-status wildlife residing in the Yolo Bypass includes giant garter snake, fairy shrimp, bald eagle, Swainson's Hawk, and more. Wildlife managers occasionally flood certain areas to create wetlands for migratory waterfowl. The Yolo Bypass is somewhat of a pit stop for the waterfowl, and it provides nesting habitat and food for this abundance of birds. The Yolo Basin Wetlands Project is accounted as being one of the largest wetland restoration projects in the Western United States. Habitats in the Yolo Basin Wetlands includes seasonal wetlands, uplands, perennial wetlands, vernal pools and riparian forest. The Bypass also holds species of riparian vegetation such as cottonwoods, black walnut, willows, saltgrass, and other assorted tree and grass species.

Habitat Management activities are monitored annually by the California Department of Fish and Wildlife's Wildlife Area Habitat Committee for area in the Yolo Bypass Wildlife Area. Each year they establish a specific management plan for different parts of the land. The targeted species for seasonal wetland management is the timothy species. This plant provides countless nutritional seeds for consumption by assorted migratory waterfowl. There are also quite a few nonnative species that are not necessarily wanted in the bypass such as dock and perennial pepperweed.

 
Years with high flows in the Yolo Bypass also benefit fish populations in the San Francisco Estuary. This is mainly because of increased habitat availability, food supply, larval transport, and reduced predation.

Agriculture
The floodplains of the Yolo Bypass are a surprisingly good farming ground for multiple seasonal crops. The California Department of Fish and Wildlife leases land to farmers through the Dixon Resource Conservation District. The most widely-grown crops include rice, safflower, processing tomatoes, corn, sunflower, and irrigated pasture. Half of the rice grown in the Yolo Bypass is wild due to its tolerance to colder weather. Farming is mainly done in late spring and summer when flooding does not usually occur, but farming can be halted or delayed depending on the water level in the Bypass.

Agricultural crops in Yolo County amount to about $300 million a year. Leftover crop residue is beneficial to animal habitat. The already-harvested land creates foraging area, and food opportunities, such as seeds for mourning dove and the non-native ring-necked pheasants.

Recreation and education
The Yolo Bypass provides a multitude of recreational uses and educational as well. The Yolo Bypass Wildlife Headquarters provides summer educational programs for children in kindergarten through high school. These programs include hands on activities on plants, animals, and wetlands, using the Yolo Bypass Wildlife Area as a classroom. They have summer camps, classes, and are open to schools wanting to coordinate field trips as well. The Bypass is also open for guided tours for all ages of the public every month.

The Yolo Bypass is often used for bird watching, hunting, and hiking. Game species include waterfowl (when the bypass is flooded), ring-necked pheasant, and mourning dove. There are also assorted trails that loop around the wetlands in the Yolo Bypass that may be accessed by the public.

Future
Recent modeling shows that increasing flow to the Yolo Bypass may be beneficial for animal habitat. An upcoming project looks to extend the Yolo Bypass by potentially pushing back the levees, and allowing more room for water to be released into the Yolo Bypass. Separately, the Bay Delta Conservation Plan includes plans to help restore fish habitat in the Yolo Bypass. Its plan is to put a notch at the top the Fremont Weir to allow for more water to flow, increasing the frequency of flooding for fish habitat.

The Nigiri Project
The Nigiri Project is a collaborative research study being done in the Yolo Bypass at Knaggs Ranch by the UC Davis Center for Watershed Sciences, the California Department of Water Resources, and the nonprofit organization California Trout.

This research is being conducted to determine how floodplains, particularly flooded rice fields, can provide habitat to endangered species such as the Chinook Salmon. In the summer these fields are used for the production of rice, while in the winter, the land can be flooded to create ideal wetland habitat for salmon. They have been experimenting for the past four consecutive winters, and have documented the fastest growth of juvenile Chinook Salmon ever recorded in the Central Valley. The experiment aims to mimic the natural annual flood cycle of the Sacramento River, which most native fish species relied upon.

This project is currently funded by the U.S. Bureau of Reclamation, California Trout, and the California Department of Water Resources.

References

Further reading

External links
Schematic of Yolo Bypass
Article about the Vic Fazio Yolo Wildlife Area

Sacramento River
Floodplains of the United States
Geography of the Sacramento Valley
Geography of Yolo County, California
Sacramento–San Joaquin River Delta
Geography of the San Francisco Bay Area
Weirs